Yury Nikolaevich Tynyanov (October 18, 1894 – December 20, 1943) was a Soviet writer, literary critic, translator, scholar and screenwriter. He was an authority on Pushkin and an important member of the Russian Formalist school.

Biography

Yury Tynyanov was born in Rezhitsa, Vitebsk Governorate, Russian Empire (present-day Rēzekne, Latvia). 

He was married to Leah Abelevna Zilber, elder sister of Veniamin Kaverin, a well-known Russian author. While attending the Petrograd University, Tynyanov frequented the Pushkin seminar held by a venerable literary academic, Semyon Vengerov. His first works made their appearance in print in 1921.

Tynyanov died of multiple sclerosis in Moscow in 1943, aged 49.

Major works

In 1928, together with the linguist Roman Jakobson, he published a famous work titled Theses on Language, a predecessor to structuralism (but see Ferdinand de Saussure), which could be summarised in the following manner (from ref.):

Literary science had to have a firm theoretical basis and an accurate terminology.
The structural laws of a specific field of literature had to be established before it was related to other fields.
The evolution of literature must be studied as a system. All evidence, whether literary or non-literary must be analysed functionally.
The distinction between synchrony and diachrony was useful for the study of literature as for language, uncovering systems at each separate stage of development. But the history of systems is also a system; each synchronic system has its own past and future as part of its structure. Therefore the distinction should not be preserved beyond its usefulness.
A synchronic system is not a mere agglomerate of contemporaneous phenomena catalogued. 'Systems' mean hierarchical organisation.
The distinction between langue and parole, taken from linguistics, deserves to be developed for literature in order to reveal the principles underlying the relationship between the individual utterance and a prevailing complex of norms.
The analysis of the structural laws of literature should lead to the setting up of a limited number of structural types and evolutionary laws governing those types.
The discovery of the 'immanent laws' of a genre allows one to describe an evolutionary step, but not to explain why this step has been taken by literature and not another. Here the literary must be related to the relevant non-literary facts to find further laws, a 'system of systems'. But still the immanent laws of the individual work had to be enunciated first.

Tynyanov also wrote historical novels in which he applied his theories. His other works included popular biographies of Alexander Pushkin and Wilhelm Küchelbecker and notable translations of Heinrich Heine and other authors.

Selected bibliography

In English
Works by Yury Tynyanov
Formalist theory, translated by L.M. O'Toole and Ann Shukman (1977)
Death of the Vazir-Mukhtar, translated by Susan Causey (edited by Vera Tsareva-Brauner), Look Multimedia (2018)
The Death of Vazir-Mukhtar, translated by Anna Kurkina Rush and Christopher Rush, Columbia University Press, 2021 (The Russian Library)
Lieutenant Kijé / Young Vitushishnikov: Two Novellas (Eridanos Library, No. 20), translated by Mirra Ginsburg (1990)
Lieutenant Kizhe, translated by Nicolas Pasternak Slater, Look Multimedia (2021)
"Permanent Evolution: Selected Essays on Literature, Theory and Film" translated and edited by Ainsley Morse & Philip Redko (2019, Academic Studies Press)

Works edited by Yury Tynyanov
Russian Prose, edited by Boris Mikhailovich Eikhenbaum and Yury Tynyanov, translated by Ray Parrot (1985)

In Russian

Novels:
Кюхля, 1925
Смерть Вазир-Мухтара, 1928
Пушкин, 1936

Novellas and stories:
Подпоручик Киже, 1927
Восковая персона, 1930
Малолетный Витушишников, 1933
Гражданин Очер

On Pushkin and his era:
Архаисты и Пушкин, 1926
Пушкин, 1929
Пушкин и Тютчев, 1926
О "Путешествии в Арзрум", 1936
Безыменная любовь, 1939
Пушкин и Кюхельбекер, 1934
Французские отношения Кюхельбекера, 1939
 Путешествие Кюхельбекера по Западной Европе в 1820 – 1821 гг.
 Декабрист и Бальзак.
Сюжет "Горя от ума", 1943

Notes

External links
A brief article on Tynyanov's historical novels
a Russian site with links to several online texts
Question about Tyutchev

1894 births
1943 deaths
People from Rēzekne
People from Rezhitsky Uyezd
Latvian Jews
Russian formalism
Russian male novelists
Soviet short story writers
Soviet novelists
20th-century Russian short story writers
Saint Petersburg State University alumni
Deaths from multiple sclerosis
Neurological disease deaths in the Soviet Union
Burials at Vagankovo Cemetery
Russian male short story writers
20th-century novelists
20th-century Russian male writers
Belarusfilm films